Erckel's spurfowl (Pternistis erckelii), also known as Erckel's francolin, is a species of game bird in the family Phasianidae.

Taxonomy 
Erckel's spurfowl was described in 1935 by the German naturalist Eduard Rüppell from specimens collected in the mountains of Ethiopia. He coined the binomial name Perdix erckelii. The specific epithet was chosen by Rüppell to honour his assistant, Theodor Erckel (1811–1897), who had helped with the collection of specimens. The species is now placed in the genus Pternistis that was introduced by the German naturalist Johann Georg Wagler in 1832. Erckel's spurfowl is monotypic: no subspecies are recognised. A phylogenetic study published in 2019 found that Erckel's spurfowl was most closely related to the Djibouti spurfowl.

Description 

Males and females have similar plumage. The body is covered with stripes of chestnut-color, on its upperside and underside. It has a black face and bill, a chestnut-colored head top and back of neck, and yellow legs. It has white ear coverts and a single streak of white behind its eye.

Distribution and habitat
Erckel's spurfowl is native to the northern parts of Eritrea and Ethiopia, as well as northeast Sudan. In 1957, the species was introduced to Hawaii as a gamebird; it has also been introduced to Italy.

Behavior and ecology
Erckel's spurfowl can hunt alone or in pairs, in scrublands or at the edge of forests. Its diet consists of plants, such as berries, seeds, and shoots, as well as insects. It is frequently inactive, but if threatened it runs up a hill. It produces territorial calls, which consist of 15–20 notes and are made from clifftops and large rocks. The species' vocalizations are frequently repeated over a long period, and have been described as "an insane cackled laughter, speeding towards the end with a bouncing ball pattern". Eggs are laid during the rainy season from April to November, with the exact time depending on the location; they are laid in May and September to November in Ethiopia, while they are laid in April and May in Sudan.

References

External links 
Xeno-canto: audio recordings of Erckel's spurfowl

 
 

Erckel's spurfowl
Birds of the Horn of Africa
Erckel's spurfowl
Taxonomy articles created by Polbot